This is a list of villages in Vizianagaram district, a district in the Coastal Andhra region of Andhra Pradesh state in southern India. Vizianagaram is the administrative headquarters of the district.

A–D 

 Ajjada
 Alamanda
 Andra
 Arikathota
 Badangi
 Balijipeta
 Barli
 Basangi
 Bhogapuram
 Bonangi
 Bondapalli
 Budathanapalli Rajeru
 Busayavalasa
 Challapeta
 Chemudu
 Chintada
 Chintapalli
 Chollangipeta
 Dattirajeru
 Denkada
 Dharmavaram
 Donkinavalasa
 Duppalapudi

G 

 Gajularega
 Gangada
 Ganivada
 Gantyada
 Garbham
 Garudabilli
 Garugubilli
 Goluguvalasa
 Gotlam
 Govindapuram
 Gumada
 Gummalaxmipuram
 Gurla
 Gurla Thammirajupeta

J–L 

 Jagannadapuram
 Jakkuva
 Jami
 Jiyyammavalasa
 K. L. Puram
 Kagam
 Kallepalli Rega
 Kantakapalli
 Karakam
 Karivalasa
 Kasipatnam
 Koduru
 Komarada
 Komatipalli
 Konada
 Kondavelagada
 Korukonda
 Kota Gandredu
 Kottakki
 Krishnapuram
 Kumili
 Kunayavalasa
 Kuneru
 Kurupam
 Lakkavarapukota
 Lakkidam

M–N 

 Makkuva
 Mamidipalli
 Mentada
 Merakamudidam
 Merangi
 Mettapalli
 Moida
 Mondemkhallu
 Mrutyunjaya Nagaram
 Naguru
 Naiduvalasa
 Nandigam
 Narayanappavalasa
 Narayanapuram
 Narsipuram
 Natavalasa
 Neelakantapuram
 Neelavathi

P–S 

 Pachipenta
 Palagara
 Paradhi
 Parannavalasa
 Peda Ankalam
 Peda Bondapalli
 Peda Manapuram
 Pedanadipalli
 Pedatadivada
 Piridi
 Puritipenta
 Pusapatirega
 Rajapulova
 Ramabhadrapuram
 Ramachandra puram
 Ramateertham
 Ravipalli
 Rellivalasa
 Rompilli
 S Burjavalasa
 Sambara
 Saripalli
 Sathivada
 Sivadavalasa
 Sivaramapuram
 Somalingapuram

T–V 

 Tarapuram
 Tatipudi
 Therlam
 Thondrangi
 Thotapalli
 Uttarapalli
 Uttaravalli
 Vengapuram
 Vepada

Vizianagaram district